At the 1984 Summer Olympics in Los Angeles, 41 events in athletics were contested. There were a total number of 1273 participating athletes from 124 countries. Women's marathon, women's 3000 meters, and women's 400 meters hurdles debuted at these Games.

Medal table

Medal summary

Men

Women

 * Athletes who ran in preliminary round and also received medals.

See also
Athletics at the Friendship Games
1984 in athletics (track and field)

References

External links
 Athletics Australia
 

 
1984 Summer Olympics events
O
1984
International track and field competitions hosted by the United States